Sylvanus Morgan (1620 – 27 March 1693) was an English arms-painter and author.

Biography
Morgan was born in London in 1620, was brought up to and practiced the profession of an arms-painter. 
In 1642, he wrote 'A Treatise of Honor and Honorable Men,' which remained in manuscript (see Brydges's Censura Literaria, viii. 236).

In 1648, he printed a poem entitled 'London, King Charles his Augusta, or City Royal of the Founders;' and in 1652 'Horologiographia Optica, Dialling universal and particular.'

In 1661, he published a work on heraldry, entitled The Sphere of Gentry, deduced from the Principles of Nature: an Historical and Genealogical Work of Arms and Blazon, in Four Books. Morgan says that this book had taken him years to compile and had been originally intended for dedication to Charles I, and that he had neglected his trade as arms-painter, suffered much illness, and had had his house burnt down.  It contains a title-page with a portrait of Morgan, etched by Richard Gaywood. The work was pedantic, and was discredited by Sir William Dugdale and other heralds; and it was alleged that it was really the work of Edward Waterhouse.

In 1666 Morgan published a supplement, entitled Armilogia, sive Ars Chromocritica: the Language of Arms by the Colours and Metals. Morgan lived near the Royal Exchange in London, and died on 27 March 1693. He was buried in the church of St. Bartholomew, behind the Exchange. He left a large collection of manuscripts, which came by marriage to Josiah Jones, heraldic painter and painter to Drury Lane Theatre, by whom they were sold by auction in 1759.

References

Attribution

External links

1620 births
1693 deaths
17th-century English painters
English male painters
17th-century English writers
17th-century English male writers